Datuk Seri Mohd Adib bin Mohamad Adam (2 July 1941 – 21 September 2022) was a Malaysian politician who served as the 5th Chief Minister of Malacca from July 1978 to April 1982,  Minister of Rural Development, Cooperatives and Entrepreneurship from 1984 to 1986 and Minister of Information from 1982 to 1984. He was a member of the United Malays National Organisation (UMNO), a component party of  the Barisan Nasional (BN) coalition and member of the Malaysian United Indigenous Party (BERSATU), presently a component party of the Perikatan Nasional (PN) coalition and formerly Pakatan Harapan (PH) coalition.

Education and early career

Adib was a student of Sekolah Menengah Kebangsaan Tinggi Melaka.

Adib served as the Assistant District Officer in Kuala Selangor. He then resigned to become the executive secretary at the headquarters of UMNO at Putra World Trade Centre (PWTC). In 1971, he was appointed the Information Attaché to the Malaysia Embassy in Netherlands.

Politics

After Adib won the Malacca state assembly seat of Ayer Panas in the 1978 general election, the Prime Minister then, Tun Hussein Onn had picked him to replace Datuk Setia Haji Abdul Ghani Ali as the new Chief Minister of Malacca. He was only 37 years old and he served as Chief Minister for four years from 11 July 1978 to 26 April 1982. He was then replaced by Tan Sri Abdul Rahim Thamby Chik in 1982 by Dr. Mahathir Mohamad who became the new Prime Minister earlier in 1981.

Adib contested the parliamentary seat of Alor Gajah, Malacca in the subsequent 1982 general election and he won to be the Member of Parliament. He was then selected to be the Minister of Information replacing Dato' Mohamed Rahmat who was appointed ambassador to Jakarta, Indonesia. He served in that portfolio for two years (1982–1984) before he was appointed Minister of Rural Development, Cooperatives and Entrepreneurship (1984–1986).

Personal life and death

Adib had four children. He died in Kuala Lumpur on 21 September 2022, at the age of 81.

Biography book

 Dato Seri Adib bin Adam - by Siti Rohana Omar.

Election results

Honours

 :
  Grand Commander of the Exalted Order of Malacca (DGSM) – Datuk Seri (1983)

References

1941 births
2022 deaths
Kuala Lumpur politicians
Malaysian people of Malay descent
Malaysian Muslims
Malaysian businesspeople
Malaysian United Indigenous Party politicians
Former United Malays National Organisation politicians
Members of the Dewan Rakyat
Government ministers of Malaysia
Members of the Malacca State Legislative Assembly
Malacca state executive councillors
Chief Ministers of Malacca